Radnor Lake State Natural Area, also known as Radnor Lake State Park, is a popular state natural area and state park in Oak Hill, Tennessee within Nashville.

The  nature preserve lies just outside Nashville. Five miles of unpaved trails wander through the woods surrounding the lake. Otter Creek Road runs through the middle of the park and is now closed to traffic. Visitors to Radnor Lake enjoy wildlife native to Middle Tennessee, including river otters, beavers, mink, muskrat, bobcat, coyote and the white-tailed deer. There is a visitor's center open Thursday through Monday.

History
Radnor Lake was created by the Louisville and Nashville Railroad Company in 1914, and was initially used for watering steam locomotives and supplying the watering pens for shipped livestock.  Afterwards, it became a local sportsman's club for L & N executives and guests. Efforts to preserve the Radnor Lake area began in 1923 when the executive vice president of L&N Railroad declared the site a "Wildlife Sanctuary" at the request of the Tennessee Ornithological Society. Executives with the railroad and their friends (The Sportsman's Club) used the sanctuary for fishing, but a reverence for the beauty of the area was present even then among L&N families and neighbors who lived in the surrounding hills.  In 1962, the property was sold to be developed but initial work proved to be problematic and public pressure influenced the state to purchase the property in 1973 and create the State's first Natural Area.

Any hunting within the natural area is illegal.

Radnor Lake State Natural Area is a Class II State Natural Area, meaning it is a day use area only, and there is no camping or picnicking allowed.

Activities

Hiking
Radnor Lake has several miles of hiking trails, featuring varying difficulty levels.

Visitor's Center 
In the entrance to Radnor Lake, there is a visitor's center that contains artwork and other exhibits on display. It also has a map of the entire lake.

Birding
Many waterfowl and transients can be found in the park, including several duck species, such as ring-necked duck, canvasback, gadwall and American wigeon. In addition, the Barbara J. Mapp Aviary Education Center is home to injured-non releasable birds, including a great horned owl, red-tailed hawk, black vulture, golden eagle, and bald eagles.

References

External links

 
 Friends of Radnor Lake
 Radnor Lake Photo Collection

State parks of Tennessee
Parks in Nashville, Tennessee
Dams in Tennessee
Reservoirs in Tennessee
Protected areas established in 1973
1973 establishments in Tennessee
Landforms of Davidson County, Tennessee